Rinard may refer to:

Rinard, Illinois
Rinard, Iowa
Rinard Mills, Ohio